William Frederick Unsworth (1851–1912) was an English architect.

Biography 
William Frederick Unsworth began working in 1869 in the Wilson & Wilcox agency in Bath, then after a one-year trip to France, he spent two years in the architectural firm of George Edmund Street, then a year with William Burges.

He opened his own architectural firm in 1875 where he first worked in partnership with architect Edward John Dodgshun (1851-1927).

Around 1908 he moved to Steep, near Petersfield, where he worked in partnership with his son, Gerald Unsworth (1883-1946) and Inigo Triggs (1876-1923). He then built several houses in the Arts and Crafts style.

He died suddenly of a heart attack at his home in Steep, near Petersfield, in 1912.

Achievements
 The "Shakespeare Memorial Theatre" and Stratford-upon-Avon Library, in 1879, with Edward John Dodgshun. This theatre was destroyed by fire in 1926. It is now the Swan Theatre.
 Village of Sion Mills, south of Strabane, County Tyrone, Ulster, in the 1880s and 1890s, for the Herdman brothers who had a flax factory there. William Frederick Unsworth was the son-in-law of James Herdman.
 Christ Church, Woking, in 1889.
 Woodhambury, Woodham Lane, Woking, in 1889.
 Weston Hotel, Newbridge, Bath, in 1890 in an Arts and Crafts style.
 All Saints Church, Woodham Lane, Woking, in 1893.
 Good Sheperd Church, in the village of Sion Mills, Northern Ireland, in 1909.
 Broad Dene, Hill Road built for Walter Tyndale by the architectural firm comprising WF Unsworth, his son and Inigo Triggs 
 Ashford Chace, Petersfield, in 1912.

Further reading
Unsworth, William Frederick, p. 788, edited by James Stevens Curl and Susan Wilson,  The Oxford Dictionary of Architects , Oxford University Press, Oxford, 2015 
 Ian Nairn, Nikolaus Pevsner, Bridget Cherry,  The buildings of England: Surrey , p. 69, 320, 533, 538, Yale University Press, New Haven and London, 2002

References

External links

 Dictionary of Irish Architects: Unsworth, William Frederick
 Archiseek: W. F. Unsworth

19th-century English architects
1851 births
1912 deaths